Štebalija is a former settlement in the Municipality of Moravče in central Slovenia. It is now part of the village of Drtija. The area is part of the traditional region of Upper Carniola. The municipality is now included in the Central Slovenia Statistical Region.

Geography
Štebalija lies in the eastern part of the village of Drtija, below the western slope of Kilovec Hill.

History
Štebalija had a population of 12 living in two houses in 1900. Štebalija was annexed by Drtija in 1952, ending its existence as an independent settlement.

References

External links

Štebalija on Geopedia

Populated places in the Municipality of Moravče
Former settlements in Slovenia